Terence John Williams (born 23 October 1966) is an English former footballer who played in the Football League for Stoke City.

Career
Williams was born in Stoke-on-Trent and progressed through the youth ranks at local club Stoke City and made his senior debut during the 1984–85 season. He played a few matches for the club in the next two seasons and left after making 17 appearances. Following his release from Stoke he decided to pursue a different career.

Career statistics

References

English footballers
Stoke City F.C. players
English Football League players
1966 births
Living people
Association football midfielders